Marchbanks Speedway (also Hanford Motor Speedway) was a racetrack located in San Joaquin Valley near Hanford, California. It hosted open-wheel and NASCAR cars, as well as motorcycle racing, in the 1950s and 1960s. The track was subsequently dismantled and destroyed.

It was originally built by local farmer B. L. Marchbanks, and named after himself.
The track began as a half mile dirt track.

Three NASCAR races were held at the track. The first was held on the dirt track in 1951. Danny Weinberg won his only NASCAR race. Marvin Porter won the race on the  paved course in 1960. The NASCAR race record was set March 12, 1961, when Fireball Roberts led all 178 laps of a  race, hosted at the track. He finished two laps ahead of the second place driver.

Lap Records
The official race lap records at Marchbanks Speedway (Hanford Motor Speedway) are listed as:

Use in gaming

Hanford is used in Indianapolis 500 Evolution.

Sources 

NASCAR tracks
Motorsport venues in California
Defunct motorsport venues in the United States
Buildings and structures in Kings County, California
History of Kings County, California